Gabrijel Bukatko (27 January 1913 – 19 October 1981) was a Serbian Roman Catholic prelate and Croatian Greek Catholic hierarch. He was an Apostolic Administrator and Eparchial Bishop from 1950 to 1981 of the Eastern Catholic Eparchy of Križevci and a Coadjutor Archbishop from 1961 to 1964 and an Archbishop from 1964 to 1980 of the Roman Catholic Archdiocese of Belgrade.

Biography
Born in Donji Andrijevci, Austria-Hungary (present-day Croatia) in the Ruthenian family of Dionisije and Julija Bukatko in 1913, he was ordained a priest on 2 April 1939 by Bishop Dionisije Njaradi for the Eparchy of Križevci. Fr. Bukatko was the Rector of Cathedral of the Holy Trinity in Križevci from 1941 to 1950.

He was appointed by the Holy See an Apostolic Administrator of Križevci on 1950 and two years later, on 23 February 1952 also was named as titular bishop of Severiana. He was consecrated to the Episcopate on 27 April 1952. The principal consecrator was Archbishop Josip Ujčić, and the principal co-consecrators were Bishop Josip Lach and Bishop Stjepan Bäuerlein in Zagreb. He was appointed Eparchial Bishop of the Eparchy of Križevci on 22 July 1960, but the next year, on 2 March 1961 become a Coadjutor Archbishop and on 24 March 1964 an Archbishop of the Roman Catholic Archdiocese of Belgrade. Archbishop Bukatko continued to govern the Eparchy of Križevci as an Apostolic Administrator until his death. Also he was an Apostolic Administrator of Apostolic Administration of Banat from 1961 to 1971. He resigned as Archbishop of Belgrade on 4 March 1980.

He participated in the Second Vatican Council as a Council Father in 1960th. He died in Vrbas on 19 October 1981.

References 

1913 births
1981 deaths
People from Donji Andrijevci
20th-century Roman Catholic archbishops in Serbia
20th-century Eastern Catholic bishops
Croatian Eastern Catholics
Greek Catholic Church of Croatia and Serbia
Participants in the Second Vatican Council
Serbian Roman Catholic archbishops